Sai Ying Pun Market is an indoor market along Centre Street, between Second and Third Streets, in Central and Western District's Sai Ying Pun, in Hong Kong near Sai Ying Pun station.

References

External links
 

Sai Ying Pun